Así Es may refer to:
 Así Es (Gerardo album)
 Así Es (Américo album)